{{DISPLAYTITLE:C10H12O5}}
The molecular formula C10H12O5 (molar mass : 212.19 g/mol, exact mass : 212.068473) may refer to :
 Danielone (CAS number : 90426-22-5)
 Homosyringic acid (CAS number : 4385-56-2)
 Propyl gallate
 2,3,4-Trimethoxybenzoic acid (CAS number : 573-11-5)
 2,4,5-Trimethoxybenzoic acid or Asaronic acid (CAS number : 490-64-2)
 3,4,5-Trimethoxybenzoic acid or Eudesmic acid (CAS number : 118-41-2)